The Treaty of Arras of 17 May 1579 was a peace treaty concluded between the Spanish Crown, represented by Alexander Farnese, Duke of Parma, and representatives of the County of Hainaut, the County of Artois, and the cities of Douai, Lille, Orchies and Arras, all members of the Union of Arras, that had been formed the previous January, at the Abbey of St Vaast in Arras. It was a separate peace that formally ended the state of war that had existed between these entities during the Eighty Years' War. The provinces that had formed the Union of Utrecht continued the war.

Background
After Don Juan of Austria, the royal governor-general of the Habsburg Netherlands had broken with the States General of the Netherlands in July 1579 and resumed hostilities the members of the Union of Brussels initially maintained their common front against the government of king Philip II of Spain. But after the death of Don Juan in October 1578 his successor, the Duke of Parma, approached a Catholic faction, known later as the "Malcontents", led by the stadtholder of Hainaut, Philip de Lalaing, 3rd Count of Lalaing and his half-brother Emanuel Philibert de Lalaing (usually referred to as "Montigny") and convinced them to engineer a breach with the Prince of Orange, the leader of the States General, over the latter's policy of "religious peace". This led to the forming of the Union of Arras in January 1579. The members of this Union (beside Hainaut the County of Artois and the cities of Lille, Douay and Orchies) then opened peace negotiations with Parma which led to the signing of a separate peace.

Negotiation history
The representatives of the parties to the Union of Arras already on 8 December 1578 (so before the Declaration of 6 January 1579 was sworn to) agreed on a first draft of the treaty. This was followed by a second draft of 9 January 1579 and a third draft of 6 April 1579. Then on 17 May 1579 the Treaty was signed between the representatives of Parma and the members of the Union of Arras. But still the negotiations had not ended and Parma succeeded to wrest a number of further concessions from the treaty partners, which resulted in the version of 12 September 1579, which was ratified by king Philip and promulgated in Mons. This differs on appreciable and important points from the treaty as signed on 17 May.

Main provisions of the treaty, as signed on 17 May 1579
 The provisions of the Pacification of Ghent, the Perpetual Edict and the Union of Brussels were reaffirmed, both by the Spanish Crown and the members of the Union of Arras (art. I)
 Roman Catholicism was to be maintained by all holders of public office (art. II, XI, XII, XV)
 There should be no more garrisons of foreign or mercenary troops, either paid by Spain or by the States General (art. V)
 All prisoners of war would be released (art. IX)
 The Council of State should be organized as in the time of Charles V
 Two thirds of the council members should be installed by all States of the member provinces consenting (art. XVI)
 All privileges that were in force at the time of the reign of Charles V should be reinstated
 Taxes imposed after the reign of Charles V were to be abolished (art. XX)

Signatories
For the Crown
 Mathieu Moulart, bishop of Arras
 Jean de Noircarmes, knight
 Guillaume Le Vasseur, lord of Walhoun

For the States of Artois
 Jacques Froz
 Antoine Germain, abbot of Vicognon 
 Nicolas van Landas, knight 

For the States of Hainaut
 Lancelot de Persant, lord of La Haye 
 Jean d'Ossignies, first alderman of Mons 
 Louis Corbant, second alderman of Mons 
 Jacques de la Croix, Lord of Callevelle, councillor of Mons
 David de Hanchin, LLD, Pensionary of Mons
 Louis Callier, Clerk of the States and County of Hainaut

For Walloon Flanders (Lille–Douai–Orchies)
 Roland de Vicque, bailiff of Watten, on behalf of the high justiciars
 Jacques de Hennin, bailiff of Comines, on behalf of the high justiciars
 Jean Pitavet, mayor of Lille, on behalf of the city of Lille
 Denis Gilbert, LL.Lic., clerk of Lille, on behalf of the city of Lille
 Pierre Charpentier, abbot of Loos, on behalf of the clergy
 Florent van den Keere, Canon of St Peter's, Lille, on behalf of the clergy
 Eustace d'Oignies, on behalf of the nobility
 Adrien Reblemette, on behalf of the nobility
 Eustace d'Aoust, chief alderman of Douai
 Philippe Broids, LL.Lic., pensionary of Douai

Governors
 Robert de Melun, Marquis of Richebourg, governor of Artois
 Adrien d'Ognies, knight, governor of Walloon Flanders
 Philippe de Lalaing, bailiff of Hainaut

Notes and references

Notes

References

Sources

Eighty Years' War
1579 in Spain
Spanish Netherlands
1579 treaties